Beyond Meat, Inc. is a Los Angeles–based producer of plant-based meat substitutes founded in 2009 by Ethan Brown. The company's initial products were launched in the United States in 2012.

History

Founding
Ethan Brown founded the company in 2009 with the stated mission of combating climate change. Brown initially contacted two University of Missouri professors, Fu-hung Hsieh and Harold Huff, who had been developing their meatless protein for years. Upon licensing Hsieh and Huff's technology, Beyond Meat launched its first product, Beyond Chicken Strips (originally called "Chicken-Free Strips"), at Whole Foods in 2012 and expanded nationally in 2013. In 2014, Beyond Meat developed its first plant-based beef product, Beyond Beef Crumbles, and has since expanded into plant-based pork. The People for the Ethical Treatment of Animals named Beyond Meat as its Company of the Year for 2013.

IPO and finance
Over the years 2013 to 2016, the company received venture funding from GreatPoint Ventures, Kleiner Perkins, Obvious Corporation, Bill Gates, Biz Stone, the Humane Society and Tyson Foods. Tyson Foods purchased a 5% stake in Beyond Meat in October 2016, but sold its 6.5% stake and exited the investment in April 2019, ahead of the company's initial public offering. By 2018, Beyond Meat had raised  million in venture financing. Beyond Meat is also backed by celebrity and athlete investors such as Leonardo DiCaprio, Jessica Chastain, Snoop Dogg, Liza Koshy, Chris Paul, Kyrie Irving, DeAndre Hopkins and others.

In May 2019, Beyond Meat went public and trades on the United States Nasdaq exchange under the symbol BYND. It is the first plant-based meat analogue company to go public. On the day of its IPO, the company was valued at $3.8 billion and was the best-performing public offering by a major U.S. company in almost two decades. As of June 2021, Beyond Meat had a market cap of $9.44 billion. In November 2020, Beyond Meat announced sales had only grown by 2% year-on-year compared to an expected increase of 40% due to the impact of COVID-19 on foodservice sales. Beyond Meat shifted its focus to grocery, convenience stores, and other forms of distribution during the COVID-19 pandemic. By September 2022, the stock price had fallen to an all-time low, that was 93 % lower than the all-time high set in July 2019 and 74 % lower than at the start of 2022. In October 2022, the company announced a 19 % workforce reduction, or approximately 200 employees, due to revenue declines.

Manufacturing
In the United States, Beyond Meat has several manufacturing facilities in the United States, including in Columbia, Missouri, and Pennsylvania. In June 2018, Beyond Meat opened its second production facility in Columbia, Missouri, resulting in a three-fold increase of the company's manufacturing space. In 2020, Beyond Meat acquired a manufacturing facility in Devault, Pennsylvania. In Europe, Beyond Meat has two facilities in the Netherlands: a co-manufacturing facility in Zoeterwoude owned and operated by Dutch company Zandbergen, and an owned facility in Enschede. These two facilities service the distribution network across Europe, the Middle East and Africa.

In China, Beyond Meat operates an owned manufacturing plant in Jiaxing. It is the company's first "end-to-end manufacturing facility" outside of the United States and began full-scale production in 2021.

Research and innovation
In 2018, Beyond Meat opened a  R&D lab in El Segundo, California. In January 2021, Beyond Meat announced that it will be opening a new global headquarters in El Segundo, CA later that year. The company says the facility will house three to four times its current number of R&D team members once the campus is complete.

Joint ventures and distribution
In July 2019, Dunkin' Donuts announced that they would begin selling breakfast sandwiches using the Meatless Sausage product in Manhattan, with plans for national distribution beginning on 6 November 2019.

In November 2020, Beyond Meat announced a collaboration with McDonald's for development of the McPlant option, a plant-based patty and chicken substitute. It started testing the McPlant in Denmark and Sweden in February 2021.
Beyond Meat also announced the launch in China of a plant-based version of minced pork.

In 2020, Beyond Meat launched an e-commerce site to sell products directly to consumers.

In January 2021, Taco Bell announced a collaboration with Beyond Meat, initially as a test and then as a permanent option for a new plant-based protein food.

Also in January 2021, Beyond Meat and PepsiCo announced a joint venture, called The PLANeT Partnership, to develop and market plant-based snacks and drinks.

In February 2021, Beyond Meat started a partnership with McDonald's and Yum Brands. These deals will bring new choices to the food menu, such as the McPlant Burger and the plant-protein based pizza toppings, chicken alternatives and possibly taco fillings for Yum Brands' restaurants KFC, Taco Bell and Pizza Hut. Testing of the McPlant burger by McDonald's in the USA ended in July 2022 after poor sales in 600 restaurants, but the product is sold in several European countries.

In September 2021, Beyond Meat announced it would begin selling their vegan chicken tenders in retail stores, including Walmart.

Civil suit
In March 2019, a civil suit was filed against Beyond Meat by its former business partner and supplier, Don Lee Farms. This was prompted by Beyond Meat's switch to different suppliers, with whom they then shared details about the manufacturing process. Don Lee Farms alleged breach of contract, and further alleged that they had expressed "significant concerns" about food safety protocols for raw materials produced at Beyond Meat's facility which were then given to Don Lee Farms for further processing.

Products

Chicken strips
The company's first product launched in 2012 was designed to emulate chicken and sold frozen. The product was licensed from Harold Huff and Fu-Hung Hsieh at the University of Missouri.  They were made from "soy powder, gluten-free flour, carrot fiber and other ingredients" which were mixed and fed into a food extrusion machine that cooks the mixture while forcing it through a specially designed mechanism that uses steam, pressure, and cold water to form the product's chicken-like texture. Although praised by some celebrities, journalists who tasted it said the "likeness to real chicken was tolerable, at best", and the chicken product was discontinued in 2019.

Beyond Burger

The company announced in 2014 that it had begun development of a new product emulating a beef burger, which was released in February 2015.

Ingredients
The burgers are made from pea protein isolates, rice protein, mung bean protein, canola oil, coconut oil, potato starch, apple extract, sunflower lecithin, and pomegranate powder. Beef products that "bleed" are achieved by using red beet juice. The products are certified as not containing genetically modified ingredients. The number of ingredients and processes involved in making the products mean they are classified as ultra-processed foods in the NOVA food classification scheme.

One burger patty contains  of food energy, twenty grams of protein, twenty grams of fat (of which five grams is saturated fat) and one gram of salt. The protein and fat content are similar to a beef patty of a similar weight, but the salt content is "much higher". Nutrition of the burger varies according to the restaurant chain in which it is served.

Beyond Sausage
In December 2017, the company announced a vegan alternative to pork sausage called "Beyond Sausage". The three varieties of "sausage" were called Bratwurst, Hot Italian, and Sweet Italian.

Beyond Meatballs 
"Beyond Meatballs", a plant-based alternative to traditional meatballs, were first introduced at Subway in 2019 through the Beyond Meatball Marinara sub. In September 2020, Beyond Meat announced the rollout of Beyond Meatballs at select grocery stores across the U.S.

Beyond Meat Jerky 
Beyond Meat Jerky is the company's first shelf stable product and the first product produced with PepsiCo under the PLANeT Partnership.

Beyond Mince 
In 2021, the Beyond range in the UK expanded to include 'Beyond Mince'.

See also 

 Impossible Foods
 List of meat substitutes
 Veganism

References

Notes

External links 

2009 establishments in California
2019 initial public offerings
American companies established in 2009
Companies based in El Segundo, California
Companies listed on the Nasdaq
Food and drink companies based in California
Food and drink companies established in 2009
Food and drink companies of the United States
Meat substitutes
Vegetarian companies and establishments of the United States